is a private university located in Kanazawa-ku, Yokohama, Japan.

History
It traces its roots to The Baptist Theological Seminary of Yokohama established by Albert Arnold Bennett, a missionary of the American Baptist Missionary Union, established in 1884. The school's name was changed to Kanto Gakuin in 1919.

Organization
Bachelors, master's, and doctoral programs are offered through the College of Humanities, the College of Economics, the College of Law, the College of Engineering. Bachelors programs are offered through the College of Human and Environmental Studies. J.D. Program is offered through the Graduate School of Law.

The College of Humanities
Department of English
Department of Comparative Culture
Department of Applied Sociology
The College of Economics
Department of Economics
Department of Business
The College of Law
Department of Law
The College of Engineering
Department of Mechanical Engineering
Department of Electrical and Electronic Information Engineering
Department of Network and Multi-Media Engineering
Department of Architecture
Department of Civil and Environmental Engineering
Department of Applied Material and Life Science
The College of Human and Environmental Studies
Department of Modern Communication
Department of Human Environmental Design
Department of Health and Nutrition
Department of Human Development
The Graduate School of Humanities
The Graduate School of Engineering
The Graduate School of Economics
The Graduate School of Law

Campus
Kanazawa-Hakkei (Yokohama) - the College of Economics, the College of Engineering, the College of Human and Environmental Studies, and the Graduate School of Law
Kanazawa-Bunko (Yokohama) - the College of Humanities
Odawara (Odawara) - the College of Law

Kanto Gakuin Women's Junior College 

 was a private junior college. On April 1, 1957, the junior college was renamed . On April 1, 1967, the junior college became a women's junior college and was renamed Kanto Gakuin Women's Junior College. It closed on September 30, 2004.

The junior college offered courses in Japanese literature, English language, life culture, home economics, food science and nutrition, early childhood education, and management information.

Sports, clubs, and traditions
The colors of the university are green and gold.

Baseball team (Kanagawa Baseball League Division I) - won 46 league championships
American football team (Kantoh Collegiate Football Association Division I) 
Rugby football team (Kanto College League Division I) - reached the national championships nine times and won five times; also has eight league championships
University championship rugby
In the Department of English, the University does foreign exchange to several countries, including its sister school, Linfield College, in McMinnville, Oregon, USA.

Notable alumni

 All members of Asian Kung-Fu Generation (rock band)
 Pape Mour Faye, basketball player
 Masashi Hosoya, basketball player 
 Tomoko Kaneda, voice actress
 Shinjirō Koizumi, politician
 Takuro Miuchi, rugby player
 Takeya Mizugaki (M.S. Electrical Eng.), professional mixed martial artist, former WEC #1 Contender, current UFC Bantamweight
 Takahiro Shimoyama, basketball player

References

External links
  

 
Christian universities and colleges in Japan
Private universities and colleges in Japan
United Church of Christ in Japan
Universities and colleges in Yokohama
Japanese junior colleges